The Merville Gun Battery is a decommissioned coastal fortification in Normandy, France, which was built as part of the Germans' Atlantic Wall to defend continental Europe from Allied invasion. It was a particularly heavily fortified position and one of the first places to be attacked by Allied forces during the Normandy Landings commonly known as D-Day. A British force under the command of Terence Otway succeeded in capturing this position, suffering heavy casualties.

Defences

The Merville Battery is composed of four  steel-reinforced concrete gun casemates, built by the Todt Organisation. Each was designed to protect First World War-vintage Czech-made leFH 14/19(t) 100 mm (3.93-inch) mountain howitzers with a range of 8,400 m.

Other buildings on the site include a command bunker, a building to accommodate the men, and ammunition magazines. During a visit on 6 March 1944, to inspect the defences, Field Marshal Erwin Rommel ordered the builders to work faster, and by May 1944, the last two casemates were completed.

Another obstacle was an anti-tank ditch covering any approach from the nearby coast.

Notes

References

Further reading
 The Day the Devils Dropped In.  Neil Barber, Pen & Sword Books 2002.

External links

 The Merville Battery - Official Site
 The 6th Airborne Division in Normandy

Atlantic Wall
Operation Overlord
Normandy
Buildings and structures in Calvados (department)
Military history of France during World War II
Military history of Normandy
Fortifications in France
World War II sites in France
Tourist attractions in Calvados (department)